Chillara is a village in Burhanpur district of Madhya Pradesh state of India.

References

Villages in Burhanpur district